The Ravenstonedale Group is a Carboniferous lithostratigraphic group (a sequence of rock strata) in the Pennines of northern England. The name is derived from the locality of Ravenstonedale in southeast Cumbria. The rocks of the Ravenstonedale Group have also previously been referred to as the Ravenstonedale Limestone. The group comprises limestones and oolites and some sandstones and shales which reach a maximum thickness of 380m in the Brough area. It is divided into a lower Raydale Dolomite Formation which is overlain by the Marsett Formation and then by an upper Penny Farm Gill Formation.Its base is everywhere an unconformity with Ordovician and Devonian rocks beneath.

References

 

Carboniferous System of Europe
Geology of the Pennines
Geological groups of the United Kingdom
Geologic formations of the United Kingdom
Ravenstonedale